Pieter Swart (born 11 September 1965) is a South African cricketer. He played in one first-class match for Boland in 1994/95.

See also
 List of Boland representative cricketers

References

External links
 

1965 births
Living people
South African cricketers
Boland cricketers